Dam Chenar-e Azizi (also Romanized as Dam Chenār-e ‘Azīzī; also known as Dam Chenār-e Qal‘eh ‘Azīzī and Qal‘eh ‘Azīzī) is a village in Chenar Rural District, Kabgian District, Dana County, Kohgiluyeh and Boyer-Ahmad Province, Iran. At the 2006 census, its population was 48, in 11 families.

References 

Populated places in Dana County